The year 2009 is the 2nd year in the history of DREAM, a mixed martial arts promotion based in Japan. In 2009 DREAM held 7 events beginning with, Dream 7: Featherweight Grand Prix 2009 First Round.

Title fights

Events list

Dream 7: Featherweight Grand Prix 2009 First Round

Dream 7: Featherweight Grand Prix 2009 First Round was an event held on March 8, 2009 at the Saitama Super Arena in Saitama, Saitama, Japan.

Results

Dream 8: Welterweight Grand Prix 2009 First Round

Dream 8: Welterweight Grand Prix 2009 First Round was an event held on April 5, 2009 at Nippon Gaishi Hall in Nagoya, Aichi, Japan.

Results

Dream 9: Featherweight Grand Prix 2009 Second Round

Dream 9: Featherweight Grand Prix 2009 Second Round was an event held on May 26, 2009 at Yokohama Arena in Yokohama, Kanagawa, Japan.

Results

Dream 10: Welterweight Grand Prix 2009 Final Round

Dream 10: Welterweight Grand Prix 2009 Final Round was an event held on July 20, 2009 at the Saitama Super Arena in Saitama, Saitama, Japan.

Results

Dream 11: Featherweight Grand Prix 2009 Final Round

Dream 11: Featherweight Grand Prix 2009 Final Round was an event held on October 6, 2009 at Yokohama Arena in Yokohama, Kanagawa, Japan.

Results

Dream 12: Cage of Dreams

Dream 12: Cage of Dreams was an event held on October 25, 2009 at Osaka-jo Hall in Osaka, Osaka, Japan.

Results

Dynamite!! The Power of Courage 2009

Dynamite!! The Power of Courage 2009 was a mixed martial arts and kickboxing event promoted by Fighting and Entertainment Group, was an event held on December 31, 2009 at the Saitama Super Arena in Saitama, Japan. The event included bouts that encompass the DREAM, Sengoku Raiden Championship, K-1, and K-1 World MAX banners. The event aired on HDNet in North America.

Results

References

Dream (mixed martial arts) events
2009 in mixed martial arts